Calliostoma jacquelinae, common name Jacqueline's calliostoma, is a species of sea snail, a marine gastropod mollusk in the family Calliostomatidae.

Description
The size of the shell varies between 6 mm and 12 mm.

Distribution
This species occurs in the Pacific Ocean off the Galapagos Islands and also off the Philippines.

References

External links
 To Biodiversity Heritage Library (1 publication)
 To Encyclopedia of Life
 To USNM Invertebrate Zoology Mollusca Collection
 To World Register of Marine Species
 

jacquelinae
Gastropods described in 1970